Labeo dyocheilus is fish in genus Labeo from southern Asia.

References 

 

Labeo
Fish described in 1839